Forfar Castle was an 11th-century castle  to the west of Forfar, Scotland.

History
The castle was apparently surrounded by water and was used as a royal castle by the Scottish kings Malcolm III, William I and Alexander II. Malcolm used it as a base for raising an army to repel Danish invaders. The castle was surrendered to the English and was garrisoned by Edward I of England, who visited it in 1296. King Robert I of Scotland captured the castle in 1306 and burned it. The castle rebuilt by the English and was in English hands when Scots, led by Philp the Forester of Platan, recaptured it on Christmas Day, 1308, and slaughtered the garrison. After demolition and rebuilding in 1308, the castle was destroyed again in 1313 and was abandoned by the 1330s.

No trace of the castle remains above ground, although there were remains up to the 17th century.

References

General
Forfar, Castle Hill—Royal Commission on the Ancient and Historical Monuments of Scotland listing

History of Angus, Scotland
Castles in Angus, Scotland
Former castles in Scotland